(Bis(trifluoroacetoxy)iodo)benzene, is a hypervalent iodine compound used as a reagent in organic chemistry.  It can be used to carry out the Hofmann rearrangement under acidic conditions.

Preparation 
The syntheses of all aryl hypervalent iodine compounds start from iodobenzene. The compound can be prepared by reaction of iodobenzene with a mixture of trifluoroperacetic acid and trifluoroacetic acid in a method analogous to the synthesis of 

It can also be prepared by dissolving diacetoxyiodobenzene (a commercially-available compound) with heating in trifluoroacetic acid:

Uses 
It also brings around the conversion of a hydrazone to a diazo compound, for example in the diazo-thioketone coupling. It also converts thioacetals to their parent carbonyl compounds.

Hofmann rearrangement 
The Hofmann rearrangement is a decarbonylation reaction whereby an amide is converted to an amine by way of an isocyanate intermediate. It is usually carried out under strongly basic conditions.

The reaction can also be carried out under mildly acidic conditions by way of the same intermediate using a hypervalent iodine compound in aqueous solution.  An example published in Organic Syntheses is the conversion of cyclobutanecarboxamide, easily synthesized from cyclobutylcarboxylic acid, to cyclobutylamine. The primary amine is initially present as its trifluoroacetate salt, which can be converted to the hydrochloride salt to facilitate product purification.

References 

Iodanes
Reagents for organic chemistry
Phenyl compounds
Trifluoroacetates